Hainan Television (HNWTV) is a television station in Hainan, China.

It was established in August 1982, and began broadcasting on October 1, 1984.

The station has five studios, two of which are 1,000 m2 and 400 m2.

The station is currently in the process of digitizing its broadcast equipment, and plans to adopt nonlinear editing and digital compression technology for program transmission.

Channels

HNTV-1
This comprehensive channel is accessible to 7.5 million viewers and reaches 85% of the province. It is also available to some parts of the Guangxi Zhuang Autonomous Region and Guangdong Province.

HNTV-1's major programs include:
Hainan News Broadcast (Hainan Xinwen Lianbo)
Xinwen Weekly (Xinwen Zhoukan)
Economy World (Jingji Tiandi)
Hainan Island (Zhongguo You Ge Hainandao)
TV Court  (Dianshi Fating)
Sun Flower (Taiyang Hua)

HNTV-2
This wired channel broadcasts programs that include:
Hainan News Broadcast (Hainan Xinwen Lianbo)
Tourism Information (Lvyou Shikong)

HNTV-3
This wired channel broadcasts general news and business information such as finance, stocks and real estate.

References

External links
Website

Television networks in China
Mass media in Haikou
Organizations based in Haikou
Television channels and stations established in 1982
Television channels and stations established in 1984